Mitochondrial dynamic protein MID51 (MID51) also known as mitochondrial elongation factor 1 (MIEF1) or Smith-Magenis syndrome chromosome region candidate gene 7 protein-like (SMCR7L) is a protein that in humans is encoded by the SMCR7L gene.

Function
The SMCR7L gene codes for a protein that has been called MiD51/MIEF1 and shown to regulate mitochondrial fission by interacting with the proteins  Drp1 and FIS1.

References

Further reading